The 2001 Ball State Cardinals football team was an American football team that represented Ball State University in the West Division of the Mid-American Conference (MAC) during the 2001 NCAA Division I-A football season. In its seventh season under head coach Bill Lynch, the team compiled a 5–6 record (4–1 against conference opponents) and tied for first place in the MAC West. The team played its home games at Ball State Stadium in Muncie, Indiana.

The team's statistical leaders included Talmadge Hill with 1,953 passing yards, Marcus Merriweather with 1,244 rushing yards and 78 points scored, and Sean Schembra with 432 receiving yards.

Schedule

References

Ball State
Ball State Cardinals football seasons
Ball State Cardinals football